Il Cannone Guarnerius of 1743 is a violin created by the Italian luthier Giuseppe Antonio Guarneri of Cremona (1698–1744).

Il Cannone is also known by the variants Il Cannone del Gesù, the Cannon, often appended with Guarneri del Gesù, the Guarneri trademark. The violin received its name from a former owner, the Italian violin virtuoso Niccolò Paganini (1782–1840), because of its power and resonance. So associated is Paganini with Il Cannone that it is common for the violin to be referenced as Il Cannone, ex Paganini.

Paganini lost a valuable Antonio Amati violin as a result of his penchant for voracious gambling. He was given a neglected Guarneri violin, a gift from an amateur violinist and businessman.  Paganini played on this instrument for the rest of his life, fondly calling it “my cannon violin,” referring to the explosive sound that he was able to make it produce. He bequeathed it to the city of Genoa, Italy upon his death, and it is now considered a national treasure.

When in need of repair, Il Cannone would be sent to the workshop of Jean Baptiste Vuillaume (1798–1875) in Paris, the greatest luthier of his day. Not only did Vuillaume repair the Guarnerius, but he also made an exact replica. The copy was so exact, that not even Paganini could distinguish one from the other. It was not until Paganini noticed subtle differences in tone that he could identify the original. Paganini presented the copy to his only student, Camillo Sivori, who would later bequeath the instrument to the Municipality of Genoa, where it now is exhibited with the original Il Cannone.

Il Cannone is exhibited alongside other Paganini memorabilia within the Paganini room of the Palazzo Doria-Tursi, the Genoa town hall. The original violin is maintained in playable condition, and is taken out and played monthly by its curator. The Cannone was played each year by the winner of the Premio Paganini contest for young violinists, which sees the Italian city attracting the cream of the crop of young violin performers (since 2002 the contest has been held every two years).  On occasion, Il Cannone is loaned to musicians for performance. In 1996, violinist Eduard Schmieder was invited and gave a recital on Il Cannone in Genoa at the Palazzo Ducale for the audience of 2000 (with pianist Valentina Lisitsa); on this rare occasion, a posthumous International Peace Prize ceremony was given by the Italian government to Yitzhak Rabin. Violinist Shlomo Mintz performed a special Il Cannone concert on Paganini's violin with the Limburg Symphony Orchestra of the Netherlands, in 1997.  In 1999, Eugene Fodor played Il Cannone at a special concert in San Francisco, California, USA.  It was the farthest the violin had ever been from Italy. Conditions of its travel included a multimillion US dollar insurance policy and an armed escort of Italian police officers. This violin has been played several times by jazz violinist Regina Carter. Carter recorded an entire album with it, Paganini: After a Dream. In February 2006, Il Cannone was taken to London's Royal Academy of Music, where it was displayed and played at a festival devoted to Paganini. 

The violin was the subject of 2017 Documentary "Strad Style", in which director Stefan Avalos follows manic-depressive violin-maker Daniel Houck in his dilapidated rural Ohio farm as he makes an Il Cannone replica for Razvan Stoica.

In 2019, the violin journeyed to Columbus, Ohio, for a one-week display at the Columbus Museum of Art under the auspices of the Columbus-Genoa sister cities relationship. Columbus Symphony concertmaster Joanna Frankel performed a single concert on the instrument.

See also 
 Antonio Amati
 Antonio Stradivari

References

External links 
 
 Il Cannone (Alberto Giordano & Co)
 Il Cannone (Comune di Genova)

1743 works
Giuseppe Guarneri violins
Collections of the Strada Nuova Museums
Niccolò Paganini